The Rahima Moosa House is a dwelling located in Johannesburg that belonged to Rahima Moosa And Dr Hassen Moosa.  The house is located in New Clare Johannesburg and is registered as part of Johannesburg's historical heritage.

A blue plaque was installed on their house in 2013 as part of the Johannesburg heritage trail.

References

Buildings and structures in Johannesburg
Heritage Buildings in Johannesburg